Mohammad Al-Anbar (born 22 March 1985) is a Saudi Arabian football (soccer) player who plays as a center-forward for Al-Shoalah.

He played for Al Hilal in the 2009 AFC Champions League group stages.

He has several caps for the Saudi Arabia national team, including a 2006 FIFA World Cup qualifying match.

References

1985 births
Living people
Saudi Arabian footballers
Saudi Arabia international footballers
Al-Sadd FC (Saudi football club) players
Al Hilal SFC players
Al-Hazem F.C. players
Al-Shoulla FC players
Al-Riyadh SC players
Sportspeople from Riyadh
Association football forwards
Saudi First Division League players
Saudi Professional League players
Saudi Second Division players